Alain Gresh (born 1948 in Cairo, Egypt) is a French journalist and former editor of Le Monde Diplomatique. He wrote articles mainly on the Islamic world and the Arab world. 
Alongside his career, he is a Palestinian nationalist activist. He is often qualified by journalists as an "islamo-leftist". A journalistic investigation of Le Figaro classifies him among the "agents of influence of Islam" in France.

Biography
Alain Gresh was raised in Cairo, Egypt. He moved to Paris in his teens to study Mathematics and Arabic. He continued studying the Near East in college, and wrote his PhD dissertation on the Palestinian Liberation Organization (PLO).<ref>"Alain Gresh", Le Monde Diplomatique'.</ref>

He was editor of Le Monde diplomatique, and retired at end of 2015. He then cofounded the website Orient XXI.

 Personal life 
His biological father was Henri Curiel, an Italian-Jew that later became an Egyptian citizen. After being exiled from Egypt in 1950 because of his communist activities, he settled in France.

Selected articles
"Shadow of the army over Egypt's revolution", Le Monde Diplomatique (August 2013)
"The Middle East: How the Peace was Lost", Le Monde Diplomatique (September 2001)

Books
In English:The PLO: The Struggle Within: Towards an Independent Palestinian State (1988).The Middle East: War Without End? (1988). With Dominique Vidal.An A to Z of the Middle East (1990). With Dominique Vidal.Ordinary Days in Dheisheh: Is the World Watching? (2000). With Munā Hamzeh.The New AZ of the Middle East (2004). With Dominique Vidal.Israel, Palestine: Truths of a Conflict (2007).

In French:Palestine 47, un partage avorté (1994).Les 100 portes du Proche-Orient, Éditions de l'Atelier (1996/2006). With Dominique Vidal.L'islam en questions (2000). With Tariq Ramadan.Palestine: Vérités sur un conflit (2001/2010).L'Islam, la République et le Monde (2004).1905-2005: les enjeux de la laïcité (2005).De quoi la Palestine est-elle le nom? (2010).
  Un chant d’amour. Israël-Palestine, une histoire française, with Hélène Aldeguer, éditions La Découverte, (2017)

 References 

External links
 Profile and column archive at Le Monde Diplomatique Alain Gresh page at Al Jazeera.
Alain Gresh on The Guardian''


1948 births
Anti-Zionist Jews
Egyptian people of Italian-Jewish descent
Egyptian Sephardi Jews
French Sephardi Jews
Jewish French writers
French male non-fiction writers
French newspaper editors
French people of Egyptian-Jewish descent
French people of Italian-Jewish descent
Journalists from Cairo
Living people
Palestinian nationalists
Palestinian solidarity activists